An hourly worker or hourly employee is an employee paid an hourly wage for their services, as opposed to a fixed salary. Hourly workers may often be found in service and manufacturing occupations, but are common across a variety of fields.
Hourly employment is often associated but not synonymous with at-will employment. As of September 2017, the minimum wage in the United States for hourly workers is $7.25 per hour, or $2.13 per hour for a tipped employee.  As a tipped employee, wages plus tips must equal the standard minimum wage or the employer is required to provide the difference.

References

Employment classifications